The Eyalet of Adana was an eyalet of the Ottoman Empire, established in 1608, when it was separated from the Eyalet of Aleppo.

History
The Ramadanids played a key role in 15th-century Ottoman-Mamluk relations, being a buffer state located in the Mamluk al-'Awasim frontier zone. In 1517, Selim I incorporated the beylik into the Ottoman Empire after his conquest of the Mamluk state. The beys of Ramadanids held the administration of the Ottoman sanjak of Adana in a hereditary manner until 1608.

Administrative divisions

Sources

Eyalets of the Ottoman Empire in Anatolia
History of Adana Province
History of Mersin Province
History of Osmaniye Province
1608 establishments in the Ottoman Empire
1865 disestablishments in the Ottoman Empire